This page shows a fleet history of the Swedish ferry company Stena Line.

Chronological (complete)

Only Stena Line's passenger, car-passenger, multi-purpose and Ropax ships are added, so not Stena Line's ships that carried only freight. The list is further complete.

1960-1969

 MS Østersøen (1962–1963, Chartered). Left the Stena fleet in 1963
 MS Isefjord (1963–1965). Now Agostino Lauro with Medmar.
 MS Gorch Fock (1963–1964, Chartered). Left the Stena fleet in 1964.
 SS Skagen 1 (1963–1965). Sold and later scrapped.
 MS Seute Deern (1963, Chartered). Left the Stena fleet in 1963.
 MS Helgoland (1963–1965, Chartered). Later Stena Finlandica.
 MS Hein Godenwind (1964, Chartered). Left the Stena fleet in 1964.
 SS Skagen 2 (1964–1968). Scrapped in 1968.
 MS Poseidon (1964–1972). Left the Stena fleet in 1972 on charter to Brittany Ferries.
 MS Afrodite (1964–1971). Left the Stena fleet in 1971.
 MS Wappen (1964–1965). Sold in 1965.
 MS Seebad Warnemünde (1964–1966, Chartered). Left the Stena fleet in 1966.
 MS Stena Danica (1965–1969). Sold in 1969.
 MS Stena Nordica (1965–1973). Sold in 1973.
 MS Stena Baltica (1966–1970). Sold in 1970.
 MS Stena Germanica (1967–1979). Sold in 1979.
 MS Stena Britannica I (1967–1968). Sold in 1968.
 MS Stena Danica (1969–1974). Sold to in April 1974 to BC Ferries, wrecked in 2006.

1970-1979

 MS Viking II (1971, Chartered). Left the Stena fleet in 1971.
 MS Stena Finlandica (1972–1975). Ex Helgoland.
 MS Stena Olympica (1972–1982). Sold in 1982 to Prince of Fundy Cruises.
 MS Stena Atlantica (1972–1973). Sold in 1973.
 MS Stena Jutlandica (1973–1982). Scrapped in Turkey in 2010. 
 MS Skagen (1973, Chartered). Left the Stena fleet in 1973.
  (1973–1978). Sold to Irish Continental Line, then chartered back in.
 MS Stena Nordica (1974). Did not serve under this name. Renamed Stena Danica.
 MS Stena Danica (1974–1981). Same vessel as above. Reverted to Stena Nordica.
 MS Stena Normandica (1974–1985). Sold to Sealink British Ferries in 1985.
 MS Stena Nautica (1974). Did not serve under this name. Chartered to CN Marine and renamed Marine Nautica.
 MS Marine Nautica (1974–1981). Same vessel as above. Chartered to CN Marine.
 MS Stena Atlantica (1975). Did not serve under this name. Chartered to CN Marine.
 MS Marine Atlantica (1975–1979, Chartered out). Same vessel as above, Charted to CN Marine.
 MS Stena Nordica (1975–1978, 1979–1980, 1980–1981). Chartered to Soutos-Hellas Ferries on more than one occasion. PHotos exist of it chartered to CN Marine in 1976.
 MS Baltic Star (1975–1977). Ex Helgoland.
 MS Drottningen (1976, Chartered). Left the Stena fleet in 1976.
 MS Viking I (1976, Chartered). Left the Stena fleet in 1976.
 MS Stena Oceanica (1978–1979). Renamed Stena Saga (I) in 1979.
 MS Stena Baltica I (1978–1982). Sold in 1982.
  (1978, Chartered). Ex Stena Scandinavica.
 MS Hellas (1978–1979, 1980, Chartered out). Ex Stena Nordica.
 MS Scandinavica (1978–1981, MS Bolero chartered from Fred. Olsen Lines). Left the Stena fleet in 1981.
 MS Dana Sirena (1978, Chartered). Left the Stena fleet in 1978.
 MS Stena Saga (1979–1988). Ex Stena Oceanica.

1980-1989

 MS Kronprinsessan Victoria (1981–1988). Renamed Stena Saga (II) in 1988.
 MS Prinsessan Birgitta (1981–1982). Renamed Stena Scandinavica in 1982.
 MS Prinsessan Desirée (1981–1983). Sold in 1983.
 MS Stena Nordica (1981–1986). Ex-Stena Danica.
 MS Stena Nautica (1981–1983). Ex-Stena Nordica.
 MS Prinsessan Birgitta (1982–1983). Chartered to Sealink UK in 1983. Would return in 1996.
 MS Europafärjan III (1982–1983). Sold in 1983.
 MS Prinsessan Christina (1982–1983). Renamed Stena Nordica, later Stena Prince.
 MS Stena Scandinavica (1982–1987, Chartered out). Ex-Prinsessan Birgitta.
 MS Jutlandica (1982–1983). Ex-Stena Jutlandica prior to sale.
 MS Stena Danica II (1983-). Still serves today.
 MS Stena Jutlandica (1983–1996). Renamed Stena Empereur in 1996.
 MS Stena Baltica (1983). Did not serve, laid up.
 MS Stena Nordica (1983–1985). Ex-Prinsessan Christina.
 MS Europafärjan (1983–1985). Ex-Prinsessan Desirée.
 MS St Nicholas (1983). Ex-Prinsessan Birgitta prior to long-term charter.
 Stena Baltica (1984). ???
 MS Island Fiesta (1984). Ex-Stena Baltica.
 MS Scandinavian Star (1984–1989). Ex-Island Fiesta. Sold in 1989.
 MS Stena Nautica (1984–1987). Ex-Stena Nordica. Chartered to SNCF in 1987.
 MS Europafärjan I (1985–1987). Ex-Prinsessan Desirée.
 MS Europafärjan II (1985–1987). Ex-Prinsessan Christina.
 MS Saint Patrick II (1985–1986). Left in 1986.
 MS Lion Queen (1985–1990, 1994–1997). Ex-Stena Saga (I).
 MS Stena Nordica (1986–1988). Sold in 1988 to Jadrolinija.
 MS Stena Germanica (1987-). Still serves today.
 MS Lion Prince (1987–1997). Later Stena Prince.
 MS Lion Princess (1987–1994). Ex-Prinsessan Desirée.
 MS Scandinavica (1987–1989). On charter to Sealink British Ferries.
 MS Stena Scandinavica (1988-). Still serves today.
 MS Stena Big Sil (1988-). Still serving in Food City today
 MS Scandinavian Saga (1988–1991). Sold in 1991.
 MS Silvia Regina (1988–1991, Chartered out). Later Stena Britannica, now Stena Saga.
 MS Stena Saga (1988–1994). Ex-Kronprinsessan Victoria.
 MS Stena Baltica (1988). Renamed Nieborow in 1988.
 MS Nieborow (1988–1989, Chartered). Left in 1989.
 SS Princess Marguerite (1988–1991). Left in 1991.
 MS Stena Bey (1988-). In dry dock
 MS Vancouver Island Princess (1988–1993). Left in 1993.
 MS Turella (1988, Chartered). Later Stena Nordica.
 MS Koningin Beatrix (1989–2002). Later Stena Baltica.
 MS Tarek L (1989). Ex-Prinsessan Birgitta.
 MS Stena Nordica (1989–1996). Ex-Turella.

1990-1999

 MS Empress (1990). Sold in 1990.
 TS Stefan (1990–1991). Sold in 1991.
 MS Darnia (1990). Sold in 1991
 MS Cambridge Ferry (1990–1992). Sold in 1992, laid up. Scrapped in 2003.
 MS Earl William (1990–1991, Chartered). Left in 1991.
 MS Stena Antrim (1990–1998). Sold in 1998 to Limadet Ferry.
 MS Stena Caledonia (1990-). Sold to Indonesia Ferry in 2013.
 MS Stena Cambria (1990–1999). Sold in 1999 to UMAFISA (now Baleària).
  (1990–1998). Renamed P&OSL Canterbury.
 MS Stena Felicity (1990–1997, Chartered). Left in 1997.
 MS Stena Galloway (1990–2002). Sold in 2002 to IMTC.
 MS Stena Hengist (1990–1992). Sold in 1992 to GA Ferries.
 MS Stena Hibernia (1990–1997). Sold in 1997 to Agapitos Express Ferries.
 MS Stena Horsa (1990–1992). Sold in 1992 to Agoudimos Lines.
 MS Stena Normandy (1990–1996, Chartered). Left in 1996.
 MS Crown Princess Victoria (1990). Ex-Patricia.
 MS Crown Princess (1990). Same vessel.
 MS Pacific Star (1990–1993). Same vessel.
 MS Stena Challenger (1991–2001). Sold in 2001 to Marine Atlantic.
 MS Pride of San Diego (1991–1992). Ex-Castalia.
 MS Stena Invicta (1991–2000). Chartered to Color Line in 2000.
 MS Stena Nautica (1991–1992, 1996-). Chartered to B+I Line in 1992, returned to lay up.
 MS Stena Britannica (1991–1994). Renamed Stena Saga in 1994.
 MS Stena Traveller (1992, 1995–1997, 2002–2004). Sold in 2004 to LISCO Baltic Service (now DFDS Lisco).
 MS Isle Of Innisfree (1992–1995). Ex-Stena Nautica.
 MS Stena Londoner (1992–1996, Chartered). Ex-Versailles.
 MS Tropic Star II (1992–1994). Ex-Pride of San Diego.
 MS Auersberg (1992, Chartered). Left in 1992.
 Stena Parisien (1992–1997, Chartered). Returned to SeaFrance in 1997. Serves today as Daniya.
 MS TT-Traveller (1992–1995, 1997–2002, Chartered out). Ex-Stena Traveller.
 MS Sun Fiesta (1993–1994). Ex-Patricia.
 HSC Stena Sea Lynx (1993–1996, Chartered). Stayed on.
 HSC Stena Sea Lynx II (1994–1996, Chartered). Stayed on.
 MS Stena Saga (1994-). Ex-Stena Britannica.
 MS Stena Arcadia (1994–1997). Ex-Castalia.
 MS Stena Europe (1994–1997, 1998-). Still serves today.
 MS Norröna (1994, 1995, Chartered). Left in 1995.
 MS Lion King (1995–1996). Ex-Stena Nautica.
 MS Marine Evangeline (1995–1996, Chartered). Ex-Duke of Yorkshire.
 HSS Stena Explorer (1996-2015). Withdrawn in 2015. Sold to Karedeniz Holding and renamed One World Karedeniz.
 MS Stena Adventurer (1996–1997). Ex-Stena Hibernia.
 MS Stena Jutlandica III (1996). Still serves today.
 HSC Stena Lynx (1996–1998, Chartered). Left in 1998.
 HSC Stena Lynx II (1996–1998, Chartered). Left in 1998.
 HSC Stena Lynx III (1996- Chartered first years). Renamed P&OSL Elite in 1998.
 HSC Condor 10 (1996, Chartered). Left in 1996.
 MS Stena Empereur (1996–1999). Renamed P&OSL Provence in 1999.
 MS Stena Jutlandica (1996-). Same vessel as Jutlandica III.
 MS Lion King (1996–1997). Ex-Stena Nordica.
 HSC Stena Pegasus (1996, Chartered). Left in 1996, only to lay up.
 HSS Stena Voyager (1996-2011). Scrapped in Sweden, 2013.
 HSS Stena Carisma (1997-?). Laid up in Gothenburg.
 MS Stena Prince (1997–1999). Ex-Lion Prince.
 MS Lion Europe (1997–1998). Ex-Stena Europe.
 HSS Stena Discovery (1997–2007). Scrapped.
 MS Stena Royal (1998–1999). Now 'Calais Seaways'.
 MS Greifswald (1998–1999, Chartered). Left in 1999.
 MS Aurora af Helsingborg (1999-). Still serves today.
 MS Götaland (1999-). Still serves today.
 (1999-). Still serves today.
 MS Trelleborg (1999-). Still serves today.

2000-2009

 MS Color Viking (2000–2001, Chartered out). Sold to Color Line in 2001.
 MS Stena Britannica (2000–2003). Sold to Finnlines in 2003.
 MS Svealand (2001–2003, Chartered). Left in 2003.
 MS Stena Hollandica (2001–2010). Moved to Baltic.
 MS Stena Forwarder (2001–2003, Chartered). Left in 2003.
 MS Stena Baltica (2002–13). Sold to S.N.A.V.
 MS PO Aquitaine (2002–2003, Chartered out). Renamed Pride of Aquitaine in 2003.
 MS Stena Britannica (2003-). Still serves today.
 MS Stena Adventurer (2003-). Still serves today.
 MS Pride of Aquitaine (2003–2005, Chartered out). Laid up in 2005 now MS Norman Spirit
 MS Ask (2003–2005, Chartered). Left in 2005.
 MS Bore-Mari (2004, Chartered). Left in 2004.
 HSC Elite (2004). Laid up.
 MS Stena Nordica (2004-). Ex-European Ambassador.
 MS Stena Freighter (2004-2018). Sold off to Blue Origin in 2018 to serve as a rocket booster landing platform.
 MS Stena Challenger (2005, Chartered). Ex-Pride of Cherbourg (III).
 MS Norman Spirit (2005, Chartered out). Sold to LD Lines in 2005.
 MS Stena Trader (2006–2010). On charter to Marine Atlantic as Blue Puttees.(sold 2015 to Marine Atlantic)
 MS Finnarrow (2007–2010, Chartered). On charter.
 MS Stena Traveller (2007-). On charter to Marine Atlantic as Highlanders.(sold 2015 to Marine Atlantic)
 Stena Progress (2009-) (Tanker of the Year, World's Top 12 Ships, by Ship & Shipping)

2010-2019
 Stena Britannica
 Stena Hollandica

2020-2029
The first vessel in the E-Flexer class is expected to enter service in early 2020, followed by four more.

Alphabetical

Stena Adventurer (built 1977) - Now  with Namma Lines.
 (built 2003)
 (built 1981) - Now Ibn Batouta with Limadet Ferry.
 (built 1966) - Scrapped in 2003 after burnout.
Stena Atlantica (built 1975) - Now the Sardinia Vera	
Stena Ausonia (built 1998) - now the Ark Forwarder with DFDS Tor Line
 (built 1973)
 (built 1973)
 (built 1986) Sold to SNAV. Now in service as SNAV Adriatico
Stena Britannica (built 1967) - Scrapped in 2001.
Stena Britannica (built 1978) - Now Finnforest with Finnlines.
Stena Britannica (built 1981) - Currently operates as Stena Saga.
Stena Britannica (built 2000) - Now Finnfellow with Finnlines.	
 (built 2002)
 (built 2010)
Stena Britannica II (built 2002)
 (built 1980)	
 (built 1980) - Now Bari with Ventouris Ferries.
 (built 1997)	
 (built 1970)	
Stena Carrier (built 1978)
 (built 2004)	
Stena Carrier II (built 2004)	
Stena Challenger (built 1991)
Stena Challenger (built 1995)
Stena Danica (built 1974)	
 (built 1996)
 (built 1983)	
 (built 1997) now the HSS Discovery.
Stena Driver (built 1982) now the Ask with Scandlines.
Stena Empereur (built 1983) now the Pride of Telemark with Kystlink.
 (built 1981)	
 (built 1995)
 (built 1980)	
 (built 1963) - now the Galapagos Legend with Galatours 
 (built 1980)	
 (built 2003)
 (built 2003)
 (built 2002)
Stena Forwarder (built 1998) - now the Ark Forwarder with DFDS Tor Line
 (built 2001)
Stena Freighter (built 1977)
 (built 2004)—used as a Roll-on/Roll-off ship until 2018; is being refit in late 2018–2019 to become a landing platform ship for landing Blue Origin New Glenn launch vehicle booster stages on.
 (built 1980) - Now Morocco Sun with Africa Morocco Link.
 (built 1987)
 (built 1975)
Stena Gothica (built 1978) - Sank in Baltic Sea, 1 November 2006.	
Stena Grecia (built 1978) - Now  with Marine Atlantic.
 (built 1972)
Stena Hibernia (built 1977) - Now  with Namma Lines.	
Stena Hispania (built 1978) - Now Finnforest with Finnlines.	
 (built 2001)
 (built 2010)
 (built 1972)
Stena Invicta (built 1985) - Now  with Color Line.	
Stena Ionia (built 1978) - Sank in Baltic Sea, 1 November 2006.
 (built 1973)	
Stena Jutlandica (built 1983) - Now Pride of Telemark with Kystlink.	
Stena Jutlandica (built 1996)
Stena Jutlandica III (built 1996)
Stena Leader (built 1975)
Londoner (built 1974)	
 (built 1993)
 (built 1994)		
 (built 1996)	
Stena Mariner (built 1976)
Stena Nautica (built 1974)
Stena Nautica (built 1974)	
 (built 1975)	
 (built 1986)
Stena Navigator (built 1984) now Poeta Lòpez Anglada with Baleària
 (built 1969)
Stena Nordica (built 1973)
Stena Nordica (built 1974)	
Stena Nordica (built 1975)
Stena Nordica (built 1979) - Now  with Ventouris Ferries.	
Stena Nordica (built 2000)
 (built 1974) now Moby Vincent with Moby Lines
Stena Normandy (built 1982) - Now Normandy with Irish Ferries.	
 (built 1972)
Stena Parisien (built 1984) - now Poeta Lòpez Anglada with Baleària
Stena Partner (built 1978)
 (built 1981) - now Eurocargo Africa with Grimaldi Ferries.
Stena Pegasus (built 1996) - now Speedrunner II with Aegean Speed Lines.
 (built 1975)
 (built 1988)
 (built 1981)
Stena Prince (built 1969)
 (built 1978)	
 (built 2009)	
Stena Project (built 1975)
Stena Project (built 1978) - Now Finnforest with Finnlines.
Stena Prosper (built 1978) - Sank in Baltic Sea, 1 November 2006.	
Stena Royal (built 1991) - now Ostend Spirit with LD Lines.
Stena Runner (built 1977) - now Stena Transfer.
 (built 1980)
Stena Saga (built 1981) now the Stena Europe.	
 (built 1974) - Now Theseus
 (built 1973) - now Egnatia III.
 (built 1974) - now Cesme with Marmara Lines.
 (built 1983)
Stena Scanrail (built 1973)
Stena Sea Lynx (built 1993)
Stena Sea Lynx II (built 1994)
 (built 1975)
Stena Seafreighter (built 2004)
 (built 1969)
 (built 1973) - now Stena Scanrail.
 (built 1973) - now Seatrade with Ventouris Ferries.
Stena Seatrader (built 1973) - now Stena Scanrail.
 (built 1973)
 (built 1977)
 (built 1979)
 (built 1983)
 (built 1984)
 (built 1979)
Stena Trader (built 1971)
Stena Trader (built 1977)
 (built 2006) - Now  with Marine Atlantic.
Stena Trailer (built 1971)
Stena Transfer (built 1977)
Stena Transporter (built 1978) - now Stena Partner
Stena Transporter (built 1978) - now Strada Corsa
Stena Transporter (built 1978) - now Diplomat with Marine Express.
 (built 1992) - now Patria Seaways with DFDS
 (built 2007) - Now  with Marine Atlantic.
 (built 1996)

Notes

References
 Fakta Om Fartyg.se
 Ferry-site.dk

Stena Line